Anne Aubrey (born 1 January 1937) is a retired English film actress.

She was mainly active in Warwick Films in the 1950s and 1960s. She worked with Anthony Newley in such films as Idol on Parade, Killers of Kilimanjaro, The Bandit of Zhobe (1959), Jazz Boat, Let's Get Married, and In the Nick (1960). She also appeared in the 1961 western The Hellions, opposite Richard Todd.

She lives in Wroxham, Norfolk.

References

External links
 

1937 births
Living people
English film actresses
20th-century English actresses
People from Wroxham